Ovide Daniel Louis Henri Soubeyran  (11 August 1875 in Dieulefit – 8 February 1959 in Turin, Italy) was a French rower who competed in the 1900 Summer Olympics. He died in Turin on the 8th of February, 1959. He was part of the French boat Club Nautique de Lyon, which won the silver medal in the coxed four.

References

External links

1875 births
1959 deaths
French male rowers
Olympic rowers of France
Rowers at the 1900 Summer Olympics
Olympic silver medalists for France
Olympic medalists in rowing
Medalists at the 1900 Summer Olympics
20th-century French people
Sportspeople from Drôme